Fartan may refer to:
 Fartan-e Kohneh
 Fartan-e Tazeh